Alphabetical is the second studio album by French indie pop band Phoenix, released in 2004.  The album has two singles, "Everything Is Everything" and "Run Run Run".

Commercial performance
The album has sold 30,000 copies in the United States according to Nielsen SoundScan. Overall it has shipped 170,000 copies worldwide  with 65,000 shipped units in continental Europe and Japan, 20,000 of those were in France.

Track listing

Personnel
Deck D'Arcy – bass guitar, keyboards and backing vocals
Laurent Brancowitz – guitar, keyboards and backing vocals
Thomas Mars – vocals
Christian Mazzalai – guitar and backing vocals

Additional musicians
Ivan Beck – acoustic guitar on "Love for Granted"
Pino Palladino – bass on "Congratulations", "Victim of the Crime" and "Alphabetical"
Jm Mery – additional keyboards on "Congratulations", "If It's Not with You" and "Alphabetical"
Alex Locascio – drums and percussion on "Everything Is Everything", "I'm an Actor", "Love for Granted" and "Victim of the Crime"

Charts

Release history

References

2004 albums
Astralwerks albums
Virgin Records albums
Phoenix (band) albums
Albums produced by Tony Hoffer